Strange Man, Changed Man is the debut studio album by English power pop musician Bram Tchaikovsky, released in 1979 by Radar Records.

Critical reception

Robert Christgau was critical of Strange Man, Changed Man in a 1979 review for The Village Voice, dismissing the album as a mixture of "old-wave" and new wave clichés and likening Tchaikovsky to "a power pop Crosby, Crosby & Crosby."

Retrospectively, Jim Green of Trouser Press described the album as "an energetic mixture of The Byrds, Springsteen and, not surprisingly, The Motors", writing that in addition to "three fine singles... the rest of the material has also worn remarkably well."

Track listing
"Strange Man, Changed Man"
"Lonely Dancer"
"Robber"
"Bloodline"
"I'm the One That's Leaving"
"Girl of My Dreams"
"Nobody Knows"
"Lady from the USA"
"I'm a Believer"
"Sarah Smiles"
"Turn On the Light"

Personnel
Bram Tchaikovsky – guitar, bass, vocals
Mick Broadbent – bass, guitar, keyboards, vocals
Keith Boyce – drums, percussion
Nick Garvey – backing vocals, bass on "Lady from the USA"
Mike Oldfield – tubular bells on "Girl of My Dreams"

Charts

References

1979 debut albums
Bram Tchaikovsky albums
Radar Records albums